Hermarchus leytensis is a species of stick insect in the order Phasmatodea. It is endemic to the Philippines.

Description
Hermarchus leytensis exhibit sexual dimorphism. Adult females are bulky and typically have a body length of 130-150mm. They are a bright green in color. Males are thin, winged, and are about 95mm in length.

Distribution
This species occurs in the Philippines, with known records from Leyte Island.

References

External links
 Phasmatodea.com: Hermarchus leytensis "Mt. Apo"

Phasmatidae
Insects described in 1997
Phasmatodea of Malesia